Mykola Lytvyn was a chief of the State Border Guard Service of Ukraine since 2003, General of the Army of Ukraine (2008). He resigned in 2014.

Biography
Lytvyn was born on March 8, 1961, in peasant family in the village of Sloboda-Romanivska in Novohrad-Volynskyi Raion (Zhytomyr Oblast).

His military career Lytvyn started out in the Group of Soviet Forces in Germany in 1979–1980. In 1980–84 he studied at the Higher Military Political College of Engineer Troops and Forces of Communication in Donetsk. In 1984–90 Lytvyn was stationed in the Transcaucasian Military District (Azerbaijan SSR) serving in the 104th Guards Airborne Division.

In 1990–93 Lytvyn was an audit student at the Lenin Military Political Academy in Moscow. After graduation he served in the National Guard of Ukraine in 1993–96. In 1996–2001 Lytvyn was a deputy commander of the Internal Troops of Ukraine. During that period he graduated from the National University of Defense of Ukraine (1998), finished a military course at the Harvard University (1997) and was promoted from Colonel to Lieutenant General of the Army (1999). Also, the National Guard of Ukraine was dissolved and mostly reintegrated back into the Internal Troops of Ukraine.

On July 14, 2001, Lytvyn was appointed the commander of the Internal Troops of Ukraine, yet in four months on November 12, 2001, he was appointed the chief of Border Troops, a state committee which in 2003 was transformed into an independent state service headed by Lytvyn. In 2008 Lytvyn was promoted to the General of Army of Ukraine.

On October 6, 2014, President of Ukraine Poroshenko dismissed the head of the State Border Service of Ukraine Mykola Lytvyn. This is stated in the decree of the President 757/2014 number of 6 October 2014. "Liberate Lytvyn Nicholas Mikhailovich of the Head of the State Border Service of Ukraine," – said in the decree .

Personal life
Lytvyn is married and has a daughter. He also has two brothers who are high-ranking officials of Ukraine:
 Volodymyr Lytvyn, Ukrainian politician, former speaker of the Verkhovna Rada
 Petro Lytvyn, commander of the Southern Operation Command.

References

External links
 Biography at the State Border Guard Service of Ukraine website

1961 births
Living people
People from Zhytomyr Oblast
Generals of the Army (Ukraine)
Ivan Chernyakhovsky National Defense University of Ukraine alumni
Lenin Military Political Academy alumni
Donetsk Military Political College of Engineers and Signal Corps alumni
Ukrainian border guards
People of the National Guard of Ukraine
2003 Tuzla Island conflict
Personnel of the Soviet Airborne Forces
Recipients of the Order of Bohdan Khmelnytsky, 1st class
Recipients of the Order of Bohdan Khmelnytsky, 2nd class
Recipients of the Order of Bohdan Khmelnytsky, 3rd class
Recipients of the Honorary Diploma of the Cabinet of Ministers of Ukraine